Ori Orr (born 22 April 1939) is an Israeli retired general and politician. During his service with the Israel Defense Forces, he headed the Central and Northern Commands. Afterward, he was elected to the Knesset twice for the Labor Party. He chaired the Foreign Affairs and Defence Committee and was appointed Deputy Minister of Defence.

Early life
Orr was born in Kfar Haim, Mandatory Palestine, in 1939. He was awarded a Bachelor of Arts degree in Political Science & History from Tel Aviv University.

Military career
He was drafted into the Israel Defense Forces in 1957, serving with the Armored Corps. During the Six-Day War, then Captain Orr commanded the Recon Company of the 7th Brigade, which advanced through the northern shore of the Sinai Peninsula. In the War of Attrition, he commanded an armored battalion in the Sinai and the Jordan Valley. He was promoted to lieutenant colonel in August 1973, becoming the commander of the newly formed 679th (reserve) Armored Brigade, which he led during the Yom Kippur War. His Centurion-equipped unit played a significant role in stemming the Syrian attack in the Golan Heights. One of the first reserve units to arrive, it helped save the Israeli headquarters at Nafakh from being overrun. Northern Front commander General Yitzhak Hofi stated, "Ori saved us today."

Following the Yom Kippur War, Orr was assigned to command the 7th Brigade. In 1976, he was made commander of an armored division on the Golan Heights, with the rank of brigadier general, and later served as Chief of Staff of Central Command. In 1981, he was promoted to general, heading Central Command between 1981 and 1983 and Northern Command between 1983 and 1986, partly during the First Lebanon War.

Orr retired from the army after 30 years of service.

Political and business career
He served as the Director General of the Jewish National Fund from 1987 until 1992. He was a member of the board of directors of Israel Aircraft Industries between 1988 and 1991 and chairman of the board between 1999 and 2003.

He joined the Labor Party, serving on its campaign staff during the 1988 elections. In the 1992 elections, he was elected to the Knesset, serving as chairperson of the Foreign Affairs and Defence Committee. After Shimon Peres formed his government following Prime Minister Rabin's assassination, Orr was made Deputy Minister of Defence. He retained his seat in the 1996 elections, while his party was in the opposition, and lost his seat in the 1999 elections. His political career came to an abrupt end when "impolitic remarks" about Sephardi Jews were attributed to him in an article in Haaretz by journalist Daniel Ben Simon.

Orr is the author of two biographical books: Follow Me (1994) (Hebrew: אחרי), and These are My Brothers (2003) (Hebrew: אלה האחים שלי).

Personal life
He is married and has three children.

References

External links

  about the Declaration of Principles by Leon Charney on The Leon Charney Report

1939 births
Living people
Deputy ministers of Israel
Israeli generals
Israeli Labor Party politicians
Members of the 13th Knesset (1992–1996)
Members of the 14th Knesset (1996–1999)
Tel Aviv University alumni